The Sanxia River is a tributary of the Dahan River in New Taipei City, northern Taiwan. The river flows through Tucheng District, Shulin District and a small portion of Daxi District in Taoyuan City.

See also
List of rivers in Taiwan

References

Rivers of Taiwan
Landforms of New Taipei